The 1968 United States Senate election in Ohio took place on November 5, 1968. Incumbent Senator Frank Lausche ran for re-election to a third term, but lost the Democratic primary to former U.S. Representative John J. Gilligan. Before losing the primary to the more solidly liberal Gilligan, Lausche had one of the most conservative voting record among Senate Democrats, leaving the Democratic Party very disappointed. In the general election, Gilligan lost to Republican Ohio Attorney General William Saxbe in a very close race. Saxbe's victory increased the number of Senate Republicans in the 91st Congress. He would serve 5 years in the Senate before being nominated by President Richard Nixon to be U.S Attorney General, he resigned the seat after being confirmed. Gilligan, who in January 1974 was serving as the Governor of Ohio, named Saxbe's successor.

Democratic primary

Candidates 
John J. Gilligan, former U.S. Representative from Cincinnati (1965-67)
Frank Lausche, incumbent Senator since 1957

Republican primary

Candidates 
Albert Edward Payne
William B. Saxbe, Attorney General of Ohio
William L. White, perennial candidate from Newark

Results

See also 
 1968 United States Senate elections

References

1968
Ohio
United States Senate